Clube Operário Desportivo (known as CD Operário, Operário dos Açores or just Operário), is a Portuguese football club based in Lagoa in the island of São Miguel in the Azores.

Background
CD Operário currently plays in the Segunda Divisão which is the third tier of Portuguese football. The club was founded in 1948 and they play their home matches at the seaside stadium of João Gualberto Borges Arruda in Lagoa. The stadium is able to accommodate 2,500 spectators. The club colours are red, white and blue.

The club is affiliated to Associação de Futebol de Ponta Delgada and has competed in the AF Ponta Delgada Taça. The club has also entered the national cup competition known as Taça de Portugal on many occasions.

History

Clube Operário Desportivo was founded on 2 January 1948 by João do Rego Lopes, the Factory Foreman at Álcool da Lagoa. The Board of the Factory agreed to authorise a Works senior football team.  It was at first known as “Fábrica do Álcool” before later becoming “Operário” and for many years was known as “Pica-Ferrugem”.

The closure of two existing clubs in Lagoa, “Os Leões” and “Os Vermelhos”, resulted in an influx of new players to Operário including Fernando Reis (goalkeeper) Jacinto Machado, Nazaré, Raul Brum and António Amaral.  The club began to grow and moved out of the Factory to a small house in Rua da Fábrica which was later acquired by the club and is still deployed by the club as their headquarters.

In 1994 the club's Executive Committee, under chairman José Eduardo Martins Mota, undertook a major project to provide new stadium facilities.  The project was initiated in 1995 and was completed in 2005.  It was undertaken in two phases and has endowed the club with a lasting legacy of excellent facilities.

In terms of success on the pitch the club won their first official competition in the 1968/69 season by winning the AF Ponta Delgada 1ª Divisão championship and the AF Ponta Delgada Taça (District Cup).  The following season Operário were the champions of the Azores. The club made significant progress in 1990/91 by again winning the AF Ponta Delgada 1ª Divisão championship and the Azores championship.  This time they gained promotion to the Terceira Divisão, national Third Division and in their first season in 1991/92 they competed against mainland teams in Série E, finishing in tenth place.  They remained at this level until 1997/98 when they won Série Açores and gained promotion to Segunda Divisão, the national Second Division (third tier).  Over the last 14 seasons they have spent all but one in the Segunda Divisão. Their best season was in 2007/08 when they finished second in Série D.

The club recognises the hard work of their coaches in the early years including Gualberto and Prof. Jorge Amaral.  In later years Operário's coaches have included Armando Fontes, Vítor Simas, Mariano Raposo, António Barata, Jaime Graça, José Luís, António Jesus Pereira, Filipe Moreira, Jorge Portela and Agathon Francisco. Finally the club acknowledges the contribution that key players have made to the history and advancement of the club, including the efforts of Jacinto Machado, Nazaré, Raul de Brum, João Moleiro, Guilherme Fragoso, Eduíno (goalkeeper), Adriano Russo, António Amaral, José Machado, Eleutério, Isaías Medeiros Ponte (goalkeeper), Diogo, Luís Tavares, Adriano Teodoro, João Correia, Viola, Norberto Machado, Eugénio, Capacheira, Laranja, Brinco, Ganeira, Mariano, Tavares, Jorge and Pauleta.

Season to season

Honours
Terceira Divisão: 1997/98, 2003/04 (Série Açores)

Current squad

Gallery

Notable players 

 Rui Paulo Silva Júnior
 Rodrigo De Lazzari
 Júlio César do Nascimento
 Cílio André Souza
 Clément Beaud
 Graciano Brito
 Rui Miguel Rodrigues Pereira Andrade
 João Botelho
 Hélder Godinho
 João Paulo Lopes Caetano
 Miguel Lopes
 Alberto Louzeiro
 Pauleta
 Pedro Pacheco
 Tiago Pires
 Rúben Filipe Costa Rodrigues
 Nuno Santos
 Hugo Simões
 Vado

Notable managers 
 António Jesus Pereira

Footnotes

External links
Official website 

Football clubs in Portugal
Football clubs in the Azores
Association football clubs established in 1948
1948 establishments in Portugal
Football clubs in São Miguel Island
Lagoa, Azores